Phlyctimantis leonardi (common name - Olive Striped Frog) is a species of frog in the family Hyperoliidae. It is found in west-central Africa in eastern Cameroon, Equatorial Guinea, Gabon, Republic of the Congo, and western Democratic Republic of the Congo. It is presumed to occur in the Cabinda enclave of Angola. It might be the same species as Phlyctimantis verrucosus found further east, showing clinal variation.  Frogs are medium to large (45 - 59 mm), with smooth skin.  

It occurs in secondary forest, forest clearings and farm bush. Breeding takes place in grassy areas with deep temporary pools, a more exposed calling habitat than similar species (which prefer denser forest).  It is a common and adaptable species but cannot withstand complete opening up of its habitat. 

Individuals from Cameroon tested positive for Bd, suggesting that this species may be at risk from chytridiomycosis, although no deaths or ill effects from the fungus have been observed to date.

References

leonardi
Frogs of Africa
Amphibians of Cameroon
Amphibians of the Democratic Republic of the Congo
Amphibians of Equatorial Guinea
Amphibians of Gabon
Amphibians of the Republic of the Congo
Taxa named by George Albert Boulenger
Amphibians described in 1906
Taxonomy articles created by Polbot